Nasir Shafiq (born 20 January 1974) is a Malaysian cricketer. He played in the 2014 ICC World Cricket League Division Three tournament.

References

External links
 

1974 births
Living people
Malaysian cricketers
People from Gujranwala District
Punjabi people